IWRG Luchas de Apuestas (Spanish for "Bet Match") is a series of professional wrestling Supercard shows , scripted and produced by the lucha libre wrestling company International Wrestling Revolution Group (IWRG; sometimes also referred to as Grupo Internacional Revolución in Spanish). All of the listed Lucha de Apuestas shows have been held in IWRG's home arena Arena Naucalpan in Naucalpan, State of Mexico, Mexico. The main event of these shows is a Lucha de Apuestas or "bet match" where wrestlers "bet" their mask or hair on outcome of the match and the loser would either have to unmask or be shaved bald afterward in the lucha libre traditions. IWRG has run a series of matches billed as either "Máscara vs. Máscara" (Mask vs. Mask), "Máscara vs. Cabellera" (Mask vs. Hair). or "Cabellera vs. Cabellera" over the years, where the main event has been a Lucha de Apuestas match.

Shows, dates and main events

References

External links
 

IWRG Luchas de Apuestas